Felix Eriksson (born January 8, 1992) is a Swedish professional ice hockey player. He played with Brynäs IF in the Elitserien during the 2010–11 Elitserien season.

References

External links
 

1992 births
Brynäs IF players
Living people
Swedish ice hockey centres
People from Gävle
Sportspeople from Gävleborg County